Castelletti is a surname of Italian origin. Notable people with this surname include:

 Michelle Castelletti (born 1974), Maltese conductor, singer, and composer
 Sergio Castelletti (1937–2004), Italian professional footballer and manager

Surnames of Italian origin

it:Castelletti